Jalalabad Assembly constituency is a Punjab Legislative Assembly constituency in Fazilka district, Punjab state, India.

Members of Legislative assembly

Election results

2022

2019

2017

2012

2009

2007

2002

1997

Previous results

See also 
Punjab Legislative Assembly

References

External links
 

Assembly constituencies of Punjab, India
Fazilka district